In the men's football tournament of the 2007 Pan American Games, the Pan American Sports Organisation expanded the number of participants from 8 to 12 and set the age limit to the Under-20 level. However, CONMEBOL, representing the South American nations, only accepted to play with Under-17 teams (who qualified through the 2007 South American Under-17 Football Championship), since Under-20 teams had to participate at the U-20 World Cup at the same time.

The United States accepted to play with their Under-18 team. Finally, Peru declined to play because their U-17 team preferred to play friendlies in Asia in preparation for the U-17 World Cup, so Bolivia took their place. 

In the final, Ecuador beat Jamaica to win their first gold medal.

Participants 
The participating nations were:

CONCACAF

CONMEBOL

 (replaced )

Preliminary round

Group A

Group B

Group C

Final round

Semifinals

Bronze-medal match

Gold-medal match

Final ranking

References

External links
  Football at the Pan American Games (Rio 2007) (archived)

Football at the 2007 Pan American Games